Chaumont Historic District is a national historic district located at Chaumont in Jefferson County, New York.  The district includes 33 contributing buildings.  District boundaries encompass 23 residences, one commercial building, one fraternal building, one church, and 15 associated outbuildings and objects.

It was listed on the National Register of Historic Places in 1990.

References

Historic districts on the National Register of Historic Places in New York (state)
Historic districts in Jefferson County, New York
National Register of Historic Places in Jefferson County, New York